{{Infobox school
|name              = Kolding Gymnasium, HF-kursus og IB World School
|image             = 
|imagesize         = 
|logo              = Logo koldinggym.jpg
|caption           = School logo, a picture of the founder Queen Dorothea, along with the caption |location          =
|streetaddress     = Skovvangen 10,6000 Kolding 
|region            = 
|city              = 
|state             = 
|district          = 
|province          = 
|county            =
|postcode          = 
|postalcode        = 
|zipcode           = 
|country           = DEN
|coordinates       = 
|schoolnumber      =
|schoolboard       = 
|authority         = 
|religion          = 
|denomination      = 
|oversight         = 
|affiliation       = 
|authorizer        = 
|superintendent    = 
|trustee           = 
|founder           = Queen Dorothea
|specialist        = 
|session           = 
|president         = 
|head of school    = 
|headteacher       = 
|head_label        = 
|head              = 
|chairperson       = 
|principal         = Momme Mailund
|dean              = 
|faculty           = 
|administrator     = 
|rector            = 
|chaplain          = 
|director          = 
|custodian         = 
|staff             = 85 teachers, plus support staff.
|ranking           = 
|bar pass rate     = 
|roll              = 
|moe               = 
|ceeb              = 
|language          = Danish, English
|campus            = 
|campus size       = 
|campus type       = 
|hours_in_day      = 
|athletics         = 
|conference        = 
|slogan            = 
|song              = 
|fightsong         = 
|motto             = 
|accreditation     = 
|rival             = Munkensdam Gymnasium
|mascot            = 
|mascot image      = 
|sports            = 
|patron            = 
|team_name         = 
|nickname          = KG|school_colours    = Red and black
|yearbook          = 
|publisher       = 
|newspaper         =
|opened            = 
|established       = 
|founded           = 
|status            = 
|closed            = 
|students          = 701 (2006)
|website           = http://kolding-gym.dk
}}
Kolding Gymnasium is a Danish senior secondary school (gymnasium), which, aside from the standard gymnasium courses, also offers the Higher Preparatory Examination (known in Danish as the Højere Forberedelseseksamen or HF) and the International Baccalaureate Diploma Programme.

 History 
Kolding Gymnasium was founded in 1542 by Dorothea of Brandenburg, Queen of Denmark, and relocated to new buildings in 1975, where it remains today. The school adopted the IBDP as one of its main types of education in 2002. In 2006 the school suffered extensive water damage, forcing some students to stay home for a week and take lessons during the Danish winter vacation in order to reach the required number of lessons before the academic year-end.

Since then, the school has had much ongoing repair; a new auditorium has been built, the façade of the school has been renovated, and a new knowledge centre'' has been built to house the school library.

References

Schools in Denmark
International Baccalaureate schools in Denmark
Educational institutions established in the 1540s